The Bruce Vale River is a river of Barbados.

See also
List of rivers of Barbados

References

Rivers of Barbados